The 1975 New Zealand Grand Prix was a race held at the Pukekohe Park Raceway on 12 January 1975.  The race had 20 starters.

It was the 21st New Zealand Grand Prix, and doubled as the second round of the 1975 Tasman Series.  Australian Warwick Brown won his first NZGP in his Lola T332 with a dominant performance where he lapped the entire field in the 58-lap race. The rest of the podium was completed by New Zealanders Jim Murdoch and Graeme Lawrence.

Classification

References

Grand Prix
New Zealand Grand Prix
Tasman Series
January 1975 sports events in New Zealand